In radio astronomy, perytons are short man-made radio signals of a few milliseconds resembling fast radio bursts. First detected at the Parkes Observatory in 1998, they were found to be caused by premature opening of a microwave oven door nearby.

The radio signals are named after the peryton, a pseudo-mythical winged stag that casts the shadow of a man. This name was chosen for these signals because they are man-made but have characteristics that mimick the natural phenomenon of fast radio bursts.

Detection 
Perytons were observed at the Parkes Observatory and Bleien Radio Observatory. Between 1998 and 2015, 46 perytons were identified at the Parkes Observatory. On June 23, 1998, 16 perytons were detected at that same location within 7 minutes.

In 2011, a group of researchers from Australia identified 16 signals resembling man-made fast radio bursts and gave them the name peryton. A peryton is a fictional animal from the Book of Imaginary Beings, by Jorge Luis Borges.

In January 2015, 3 perytons were detected at the Parkes Observatory. As of 2015, 25 perytons had been the subject of scientific publications.

Origin hypotheses 
These signals mimic some aspects of fast radio bursts (FRB) that appear to be coming from outside the Milky Way galaxy, but their astronomical origin was soon excluded. Hypothesized potential sources of perytons included:

 Signals from aircraft
 Flashes in the ionosphere
 Lightning
 Solar flares
 Terrestrial gamma-ray bursts
 Narrow bipolar pulse (electrical discharges between clouds at high altitude with a capacity of several hundred gigawatts)

Identification of origin 

On March 17, 2015, 3 perytons were produced by experimentation by putting ceramic mugs filled with water in a microwave oven and opening the door before it was done.

In 2015, perytons were found to be the result of premature opening of microwave oven doors at the Parkes Observatory. The microwave oven releases a frequency-swept radio pulse that mimics a fast radio burst as the magnetron turns off. Two Matsushita microwave ovens were deemed responsible for most of the perytons. Both were functional and over 27 years old.

References

External links 
 What is a peryton? at Physics Stack Exchange

See also 

 Fast radio burst
 Wow! signal

Astrophysics
Radio astronomy
Microwave transmission